Francisco de Melo (died 1536) was a Roman Catholic prelate who was named as the first Bishop of Goa (1533–1536).

Biography
On 31 Jan 1533, Francisco de Melo was appointed during the papacy of Pope Clement VII as the first Bishop of Goa. He never took possession of the diocese as he died in Evora, Portugal prior to his departure on 27 Apr 1536.

References

External links and additional sources
  (for Chronology of Bishops) 
  (for Chronology of Bishops) 

16th-century Roman Catholic bishops in India
Bishops appointed by Pope Clement VII
1536 deaths